Flumetasone, also known as flumethasone, is a corticosteroid for topical use.

It was patented in 1951 and approved for medical use in 1964.

Chemistry
Flumethasone is 420 times as potent as cortisone in an animal model for anti-inflammatory activity.

Names
Trade names include Locacorten, Locorten, and Orsalin.  It is available in combination with clioquinol, under the trade name Locacorten-Vioform (in some countries Locorten-Vioform),  for the treatment of otitis externa and otomycosis.  It is usually formulated as the pivalic acid ester prodrug called flumetasone pivalate.

See also
 Glucocorticoid
 Corticosteroid
 Triamcinolone acetonide

References

Glucocorticoids
Organofluorides